Bourbonne-les-Bains is a commune in the Haute-Marne department in north-eastern France in the region Grand Est. It is situated on the river Apance, 32 km north-east of Langres.

Population

Spa
Bourbonne is a health resort due to hot springs. These thermal springs were known to the Gauls and to the Romans who built baths. The Romans called the springs Aquae Borvonis. The name probably derives from the Gallo-Roman deity Borvo. More than 11,000 patients visit the spa each year.

Sights
Arboretum de Montmorency

See also
Communes of the Haute-Marne department

References

Communes of Haute-Marne
Spa towns in France
Lingones
Champagne (province)